The Mongolian records in swimming are the fastest ever performances of swimmers from Mongolia, which are recognised and ratified by the Mongolian Amateur Swimming Federation.

All records were set in finals unless noted otherwise.

Long Course (50 m)

Men

Women

Mixed relay

Short Course (25 m)

Men

Women

Mixed relay

References
General
Mongolian Long Course record progressions 2 August 2021 updated
Specific

Mongolia
Records
Swimming
swimming